Véronique Fournier served on the Montreal city council, representing Saint-Henri–La Petite-Bourgogne–Pointe-Saint-Charles as a member of Vision Montreal.

Early life and career
Véronique Fournier has taught democratic practices for community organizations at the Université du Québec à Montréal (UQAM) and, as of 2013, is pursuing a graduate degree in public administration from the École nationale d'administration publique (ENAP).

City councillor
Fournier was elected to Montreal city council in the 2009 municipal election, winning a narrow victory over Union Montreal and Projet Montréal candidates. Union Montreal won a council majority and formed government, initially with the two other parties as junior coalition partners and subsequently on its own.

Fournier was appointed as vice-chair of Montreal's finance committee in March 2012. Later in the same year, she accused the municipal government of being "far too timid" in its negotiations with city employees on pension changes. She also argued that the city should directly oversee construction of the Bonaventure Expressway, rather than contracting the work out to the Société du Havre de Montréal (SHM).

By virtue of holding her position on city council, Fournier also serves on the Sud-Ouest borough council, where she has served as chair of the urban planning and advisory committee. In 2011, the borough council voted to close the historical Bain Emard indoor pool due to a budgetary shortfall; Fournier described this as "a heartbreaking choice, but at this point the responsible choice." On other occasions, she has championed the preservation of heritage buildings. In 2012, she accused Transports Québec of having ignored the concerns of local residents in its plan to rebuild Montreal's Turcot Interchange.

Montreal mayor Gérald Tremblay resigned in late 2012 and was replaced by Michael Applebaum, who formed a new administration with representation from all parties on council and some independents. Shortly thereafter, Applebaum chose Fournier as one of two of his appointed representatives on the Ville-Marie borough council. In January 2013, Fournier welcomed Applebaum's announcement that the city would take control of the Bonaventure Expressway from the SHM.

Provincial politics
In the 2014 provincial election, she ran for the Parti Québécois in Saint-Henri–Sainte-Anne but was defeated by incumbent Marguerite Blais.

Electoral record

References

External links
City of Montreal biography (in French)
Vision Montreal biography (in French)

Living people
Montreal city councillors
Women in Quebec politics
Women municipal councillors in Canada
Year of birth missing (living people)
Place of birth missing (living people)